The 2013–14 UTSA Roadrunners women's basketball team represents the University of Texas at San Antonio during the 2013–14 NCAA Division I women's basketball season. The Roadrunners, led by first year head coach Lubomyr Lichonczak, play their home games at the Convocation Center and are first year members of Conference USA.

Roster

Schedule

|-
!colspan=9| Regular Season

|-
!colspan=9| C-USA Tournament

See also
 2013–14 UTSA Roadrunners men's basketball team

References

UTSA Roadrunners women's basketball seasons
UTSA Roadrunners
UTSA Roadrunners
UTSA Roadrunners